Gala Television Corporation is a nationwide cable TV network in Taiwan that is operated by the Gala Television Corporation, established on June 13, 1997.

GTV channels
GTV currently operates four commercial cable and satellite television channels:
GTV One / CH 27
GTV Variety Show / CH 28
GTV Drama / CH 41
GTV Entertainment formerly in partnership with Seoul Broadcasting System to provide Korean variety shows and dramas in Taiwan.

See also
 List of Taiwanese television series

References

External links
  GTV official website
  GTV company profile
 

Television stations in Taiwan
Television channels and stations established in 1997
Chinese-language television stations
1997 establishments in Taiwan